, also spelled as Kita Daitō, Kita-Daitō-shima, and Kitadaitō, is the northernmost island in the Daitō Islands group, located in the Philippine Sea southeast of Okinawa, Japan. It is administered as part of the village of Kitadaitō, Shimajiri District, Okinawa. The island is entirely cultivated for agriculture, although it lacks freshwater sources. The island has no beaches but has a fishing harbor, three ferry docks and an airport (Kitadaito Airport) (airport code "KTD") for local flights.

Geography
As with the other islands in the archipelago, Kitadaitōjima is an uplifted coral atoll with a steep coastal cliff of limestone (the former fringing coral reef of the island), and a depressed center (the former lagoon of the island).

The 660 (as of June 1, 2013) inhabitants live in a village in the center of the island.

Gallery

Climate
Kitadaitōjima has a tropical rainforest climate (Köppen climate classification Af) with very warm summers and mild winters. Precipitation is significant throughout the year; the wettest month is May and the driest month is February. The island is subject to frequent typhoons.

History
It is uncertain when Minamidaitōjima was discovered. It is the most likely that their first sighting was by the Spanish navigator Bernardo de la Torre in 1543, in between 25 September and 2 October, during his abortive attempt to reach New Spain from the Philippines with the San Juan de Letran. It was then charted, together with Kitadaitōjima, as Las Dos Hermanas (The Two Sisters). There is little doubt that Minamidaitōjima and Kitadaitōjima were again sighted by the Spanish on 28 July 1587, by Pedro de Unamuno who named them Islas sin Probecho (Useless Islands).  However, on 2 July 1820, the Russian vessel Borodino surveyed the two Daitō islands and named the south as "South Borodino Island".

The island remained uninhabited until claimed by the Empire of Japan in 1885.

During this period until World War II, Kitadaitōjima was owned in its entirety by Dai Nippon Sugar (now Dai Nippon Meiji Sugar), which also operated mines for the extraction of guano for use in fertilizer. Many of the inhabitants were seasonal workers from Okinawa and Taiwan. After World War II, the island was occupied by the United States. The use of increased mechanization increased phosphate yields marginally until the deposits were exhausted by the mid-1950s. The island was returned to Japan in 1972.

References

External links

 official home page

Daitō Islands
Islands of Okinawa Prefecture